In 2002, Raju lost an election to Atique Ahmad. However, in 2004, Ahmad resigned after being elected to the Lok Sabha. Raju Pal won the subsequent by-election in November 2004, defeating Atique's younger brother Mohammad Ashraf.

However, in January 2005, Raju Pal was shot dead while going to his village for the Republic day parade. Thereafter, Ashraf won the seat by defeating Pal's wife Puja Pal. Ashraf is the prime accused in the murder. Mohammad Ashraf's brother 
Atique has also been charged with complicity in the murder.  While Atique is currently in jail with 21 criminal cases pending against him, the Mayawati government faced criticism for its failure to arrest Ashraf.

References

Indian politicians convicted of crimes
Samajwadi Party politicians
Assassinated Indian politicians
2005 deaths
Bahujan Samaj Party politicians from Uttar Pradesh
Uttar Pradesh MLAs 2002–2007
Year of birth missing
People from Allahabad district
People murdered in Uttar Pradesh